"Candidatus Caballeronia calva" is a bacterium from the genus Caballeronia and the family Burkholderiaceae. "Candidatus Caballeronia calva" is an endosymbiont of Psychotria calva.

References

Burkholderiaceae
Bacteria described in 2004
Candidatus taxa